GFPS may refer to:
Grand Forks Public Schools, the public school system of Grand Forks, North Dakota
Great Falls Public Schools, the public school system of Great Falls, Montana
Geranylfarnesyl diphosphate synthase, an enzyme
Google Fast Pair Service (GFPS), standard for quickly pair Bluetooth devices when they come in close proximity for the first time